Court of Appeals of the District of Columbia may refer to:

The Court of Appeals of the District of Columbia, a former name of the current United States Court of Appeals for the District of Columbia Circuit
District of Columbia Court of Appeals, the current appellate court of the District of Columbia